The 1969 Copa del Generalísimo was the 67th staging of the Spanish Cup. The competition began on 4 May 1969 and concluded on 15 June 1969 with the final.

Round of 16

|}
Tiebreaker

|}

Quarter-finals

|}

Semi-finals

|}
Tiebreaker

|}

Final

|}

External links
 rsssf.com
 linguasport.com

1969
Copa del Rey
Copa